The 2023 Formula 4 UAE Championship was the seventh season of the Formula 4 UAE Championship, a motor racing series for the United Arab Emirates regulated according to FIA Formula 4 regulations, and organised and promoted by the Emirates Motorsport Organization (EMSO) and Top Speed.

The regular season commenced on 13 January at the Dubai Autodrome and concluded on 19 February at the Yas Marina Circuit.

Teams and drivers 

 Maffi Racing and Renauer Motorsport were scheduled to enter the championship, but did not appear in any rounds.
 Jerónimo Berrío was scheduled to compete for MP Motorsport, but did not appear in any rounds.

Race calendar 
The schedule consisted of 15 races over 5 rounds. Prior to start of the season, a non-championship Trophy Round was held in support of the 2022 Abu Dhabi Grand Prix. On 10 November 2022, the round 2 at Dubai Autodrome was moved to Kuwait Motor Town.

Championship standings
Points were awarded to the top 10 classified finishers in each race.

Drivers' Championship

Rookies' Championship

Teams' Championship 
Ahead of each event, the teams nominate two drivers that accumulate teams' points.

Notes

References

External links 

 

Formula 4 UAE Championship seasons
F4 UAE
F4 UAE
F4 UAE